Roberto Savarese (1910–1996) was an Italian screenwriter and film director. He also worked as an assistant or second unit director, as he did on Henri-Georges Clouzot's The Wages of Fear in 1953.

Selected filmography
 La principessa del sogno (1942)
 Lascia cantare il cuore (1943)
 Seven Years of Happiness (1943)
 The Fighting Men (1950)
 Mamma Mia, What an Impression! (1951)
 The Wages of Fear (1953)
 Dinanzi a noi il cielo (1957)

References

Bibliography
 Chiti, Roberto & Poppi, Roberto. Dizionario del cinema italiano: Dal 1945 al 1959. Gremese Editore, 1991.
 Lloyd, Christopher. Henri-Georges Clouzot: French Film Directors. Manchester University Press, 2007.

External links

1910 births
1996 deaths
Italian film directors
Italian screenwriters
Film people from Rome
20th-century Italian screenwriters